English Electric Type 4 may refer to:

 British Rail Class 40
 British Rail Class 50